Rose B. Simpson (Santa Clara Pueblo) (born 1983) is a mixed-media artist who works in ceramic, metal, fashion, painting, music, performance, and installation. She lives and works in Santa Clara Pueblo, New Mexico. Her work has been exhibited at SITE Santa Fe (2008, 2015); the Heard Museum (2009, 2010); the Museum of Contemporary Native Art, Santa Fe (2010); the National Museum of the American Indian, Smithsonian (2008); the Denver Art Museum; Pomona College Museum of Art (2016); Ford Foundation Gallery (2019); The Wheelwright Museum of the American Indian (2017); the Minneapolis Institute of Art (2019); the Savannah College of Art and Design (2020); and the Nevada Museum of Art (2021).

Education
Simpson studied art at the University of New Mexico and the Institute of American Indian Arts, Santa Fe, where she received her BFA in 2007. She went on to receive an MFA in Ceramics from the Rhode Island School of Design in 2011  and another MFA in Creative Non-Fiction from the Institute of American Indian Arts in 2018. She is also a graduate of the now defunct automotive science program at Northern New Mexico College in Española, New Mexico.

Artwork
Simpson is a mixed-media artist, whose work artwork investigates the complex issues of past, present and future aspects of humanity’s tenuous survival in our current ecological condition.

Exhibitions 

In 2021, Simpson opened the large-scale solo exhibition "Countdown," at Savannah College of Art and Design.

In 2019 to 2020, her work was featured in the traveling exhibition, “Hearts of Our People”. Simpson exhibited the sculptural work, Maria, an homage to the San Ildefonso Native American ceramicist, Maria Martinez in which she modified and customized a 1985 Chevy El Camino with San Ildefonso blackware (glossy black on matte black) pottery designs.

In 2018 to 2019 Simpson had a solo museum retrospective exhibition at the Wheelwright Museum of the American Indian, Santa Fe New Mexico, titled LIT: The Work of Rose B. Simpson. The museum produced a catalog of Simpson's work in conjunction with the exhibition.

In 2016 she had a solo exhibition, entitled Ground, at the Pomona College Museum of Art, California.
In this exhibition she acted within the role of artist and curator. She mined the museum's collections to recontextualize historical objects among her own sculptures to "obliterate the western dichotomy of aesthetic versus utilitarian objects to propose an indigenous aesthetic of use and human connectedness'. Her intention in doing so was "to ground oneself is to reconnect physically to the earth, to root, to restore power, to build a strong foundation."

In 2016, her work was included in Con Cariño: Artists Inspired by Lowriders at the New Mexico Museum of Art.

Collections
 Clay Art Center of Port Chester, New York
Denver Art Museum
Museum of Fine Arts Boston
Portland Art Museum
 Peabody Essex Museum, Salem, MA
San Francisco Museum of Modern Art

Awards / Fellowships / Residencies 
 2021 Simpson was awarded the Joan Mitchell Fellowship from the Joan Mitchell Foundation
2021 Production and Exhibition Grant, Via Art Fund, Boston, MA
2021 Residency, The Fabric Workshop and Museum, Philadelphia, PA
2021 Residency, Tamarind Institute, Albuquerque, NM
2020 Residency, Anderson Ranch Arts Residency, Snowmass, CO
2020 President’s Award for Art and Activism, Women’s Caucus for Art, Chicago, IL
2017 Simpson was awarded a fellowship from the National Parks Foundation for a residency at Aztec Ruins National Monument
2013 National Artist Fellowship, Native Arts & Cultures Foundation

Personal life 
Simpson comes from a long line of Santa Clara Pueblo ceramic artists, including her mother Roxanne Swentzell, her great-aunt Nora Naranjo-Morse, and her great her great uncle Michael Naranjo. Her father is the sculptor, Patrick Simpson.

Musical career
For a number of years, Simpson was the lead singer in the Native American punk band, Chocolate Helicopter. She also played in the hip-hop band, Garbage Pail Kidz.

References 

1983 births
Artists from New Mexico
Institute of American Indian Arts alumni
Rhode Island School of Design alumni
Living people
Santa Clara Pueblo people
20th-century Native Americans
21st-century Native Americans
21st-century American artists
21st-century American women artists
20th-century Native American women
21st-century Native American women